Kobelco Construction Machinery America, LLC. is a manufacturer of excavators based in Houston, Texas, United States, with a manufacturing plant in Moore, South Carolina and is a subsidiary of Kobe Steel. A former global sales alliance between Kobe Steel and CNH Global ended in December 2012.

References

External links
 http://kobelco-usa.com/

Construction equipment manufacturers of the United States
Manufacturing companies based in Houston